Clifford Otte is a former member of the Wisconsin State Assembly.

Biography
Otte was born on January 15, 1933, in Wilson, Sheboygan County, Wisconsin. He graduated from Oostburg High School in Oostburg, Wisconsin, and served in the United States Navy during the Korean War. Otte was also a member of the fire department in the Town of Sheboygan Falls, Wisconsin. He is married with six children.

Political career
Otte was first elected to the Assembly in 1992. Additionally, he was a member of the Town of Sheboygan Falls School Board from 1973 to 1984, the Town of Sheboygan Falls Clerk and Supervisor from 1977 to 1984 and a Sheboygan County, Wisconsin, supervisor from 1982 to 1993. He is a Republican.

References

People from Sheboygan County, Wisconsin
Republican Party members of the Wisconsin State Assembly
County supervisors in Wisconsin
School board members in Wisconsin
1933 births
Living people
People from Sheboygan Falls, Wisconsin